Immunobiology  is a peer-reviewed medical journal covering immunology, published by Elsevier. It was established in 1908 as the Zeitschrift für Immunitätsforschung and renamed Immunobiology in 1980. According to the Journal Citation Reports, the journal has a 2013 impact factor of 3.180.

References

External links
 

Immunology journals
Elsevier academic journals
Publications established in 1908